John Panton (29 October 1815 – 2 September 1866) was a politician in Australia. He was a Member of the New South Wales Legislative Council, and a Member of the Queensland Legislative Council.

Early life
John Panton was born on 29 October 1815 in North Leith, Midlothian, Scotland, the son of George (Baillie) Panton and his wife Maria Kerr. In 1818, the family immigrated to New South Wales on the General Stewart. His father became the Postmaster-General of New South Wales.

Business life 
In about 1840, he established a merchant business, Betts & Panton, with John Betts (who had married John Panton's sister Margaret); they conducted business in Windsor and Sydney. In 1842, he married Isabella Frederica North at Windor; they had seven sons and five daughters. He toured the Moreton Bay district of New South Wales and decided that there were good opportunities there. In 1851 he relocated to Ipswich and established a mercantile business in Brisbane Street. In 1858, he commissioned a large residence called Claremont, but a downturn in his finances forced him to sell it in 1863 to George Thorn (senior). In 1865 the family built another house also called Claremont at 5 Blackall Street, East Ipswich.

He was a trustee of the Ipswich Grammar School.

Politics
Panton was elected to the New South Wales Legislative Council representing the Counties of Cook and Westmoreland on 1 June 1843; he held that role until 20 June 1848.

Panton was appointed to the Queensland Legislative Council on 22 February 1866 and served until his death on 2 September 1866.

Later life
John Panton died in Ipswich on 2 September 1866 at his home (the second Claremont) from apoplexy. He was buried in Ipswich General Cemetery.

Legacy
There is a memorial tablet for John Panton in St Pauls Anglican Church.

His residence (the first) Claremont is now listed on the Queensland Heritage Register.

References

Further reading
 

Members of the Queensland Legislative Council
1815 births
1866 deaths
Burials at Ipswich General Cemetery
Members of the New South Wales Legislative Council
19th-century Australian politicians